DUO is a contemporary twin-tower integrated mixed-use development in Singapore, comprising residential accommodation, offices, a hotel and a retail gallery.

Duo, together with Marina One at the Marina Bay area - both mixed-use developments - were developed at the same time by M+S, a joint venture between the sovereign wealths of Singapore and Malaysia - Temasek Holdings and Khazanah Nasional. It was designed by Ole Scheeren.

There are two main towers – one comprise offices and a luxury boutique hotel Andaz (part of Hyatt group), while the other tower comprise 660 residential units. The complex was opened on 15 January 2018. On 8 October 2019, one of the towers which include the Andaz Hotel component of the development was sold for $475 million to Hoi Hup Realty.

Site plans
DUO is bordered by Ophir Road, Rochor Road and Beach Road. The complex is directly connected to the Bugis MRT station served by the East West Line and  Downtown Line.

Awards
DUO won the Silver award in the “Best Futura Project” category at MIPIM Asia Awards 2012.

DUO received the Council of Tall Buildings’ Urban Habitat Award 2021.

Gallery

References

 
 “Najib in town for retreat with PM Lee”. The Business Times, 19 February 2013
 “CapitaLand plans township in Iskandar: report”. The Business Times, 19 February 2013
 “Staying ahead of the curve”. The Straits Times, 17 November 2012
 “M+S unveils design of S$3b ‘Duo’. The Business Times, 15 November 2012
 “New landmarks for old train stations”. Singapore Business Review, January 2013
 “Khazanah, Temasek perkenal projek bersepadu Duo”. Berita Harian, 15 November 2012
 “Design for Rochor integrated development unveiled”. AsiaOne.com, 14 November 2012

External links
 Link to Marina One website http://www.duosingapore.com/duo-tower.html

2018 establishments in Singapore
Skyscraper hotels in Singapore
Skyscraper office buildings in Singapore
Residential skyscrapers in Singapore